Jesse Corcoran Adkins (April 13, 1879 – March 29, 1955) was a United States district judge of the United States District Court for the District of Columbia.

Education and career

Born in Knoxville, Tennessee, Adkins received a Bachelor of Laws from Georgetown Law in 1899 and a Master of Laws from the same institution in 1900. He was an Assistant United States Attorney in Washington, D.C. from 1905 to 1908. He was a special assistant to the United States Attorney General in the United States Department of Justice, from 1908 to 1911. He was in private practice of law in Washington, D.C. from 1908 to 1911. He was an Assistant United States Attorney General from 1911 to 1914, and served again as a special assistant to the Attorney General from 1914 to 1916. He returned to private practice in Washington, D.C. from 1916 to 1930. He was a member of the faculty of Georgetown Law from 1910 to 1945.

Federal judicial service

Adkins was nominated by President Herbert Hoover on June 6, 1930, to an Associate Justice seat on the Supreme Court of the District of Columbia (Associate Justice of the District Court of the United States for the District of Columbia from June 25, 1936, now the United States District Court for the District of Columbia) vacated by Associate Justice Alfred Adams Wheat. He was confirmed by the United States Senate on June 17, 1930, and received his commission the same day. He assumed senior status due to a certified disability on October 15, 1946. His service terminated on March 29, 1955, due to his death in Washington, D.C.

References

Sources
 

1879 births
1955 deaths
Judges of the United States District Court for the District of Columbia
United States district court judges appointed by Herbert Hoover
20th-century American judges
Georgetown University Law Center alumni
Georgetown University Law Center faculty
United States Assistant Attorneys General
People from Knoxville, Tennessee
Assistant United States Attorneys